Courcelles is a municipality in Le Granit Regional County Municipality in the Estrie region in Quebec, Canada.

Artist Carmen Coulombe was born in Courcelles.

History 
The Municipality of Courcelles was founded on April 6, 1904. It was made from parts of the neighboring municipalities of Lambton, Saint-Sébastien and Saint-Évariste-de-Forsyth.

Demographics 
In the 2021 Census, Statistics Canada reported that Courcelles had a population of 814 living in 391 of its 430 total dwellings, an -1.1% change from its 2016 population of 823.

References

External links

Municipalities in Quebec
Incorporated places in Estrie
Le Granit Regional County Municipality